The 2016–17 season is Coventry City's 133rd season in their existence and fifth consecutive in the English third tier, League One. Along with competing in League One, the club participated in three cup competitions: FA Cup, EFL Cup and EFL Trophy.

The season covers the period between 1 July 2016 and 30 June 2017.

Review and events

July
Réda Johnson, Marc-Antoine Fortuné, Conor Thomas, Aaron Martin, Martin Lorentzson, Jim O'Brien, Aaron Phillips, Peter Ramage, Stephen Hunt and Darius Henderson are all released following the end of their contracts.

Competitions

Preseason friendlies
On 24 May 2016, Coventry City announced they will visit National League North side Nuneaton Town on 9 July. Three days later, the Sky Blues announced they will face Championship side Norwich City on 26 July. On 24 June, Coventry announced their full pre-season schedule.

On 10 July 2016, Coventry City confirmed they will play Ettifaq on Saturday 16, July. Three days later, the club announced a change to the friendly against the Saudi Arabian side and instead will now play Sturm Graz.

League One

League table

Results summary

Results by matchday

Results
On 22 June 2016, the fixtures for the 2016–17 season were announced.

FA Cup

EFL Cup

The draw for the first round was made on 22 June 2016, via a live stream on Facebook. Coventry City were drawn at home to League Two side Portsmouth.

EFL Trophy

The 2016–17 EFL Trophy group stage draw was made on 27 July 2016. Coventry City faced Northampton Town, Wycombe Wanderers and West Ham United Academy during this phase of the competition.

Birmingham Senior Cup

Squad information

Squad details

* Player age and appearances/goals for the club as of beginning of 2016–17 season.

Appearances
Correct as of match played on 30 April 2017

Goalscorers
Correct as of match played on 30 April 2017

Assists
Correct as of match played on 30 April 2017

Yellow cards
Correct as of match played on 30 April 2017

Red cards
Correct as of match played on 30 April 2017

Captains
Correct as of match played on 30 April 2017

Suspensions served

Monthly & weekly awards

End-of-season awards

Transfers

Transfers in

Transfers out

Loans in

Loans out

Trials

References

External links
 Official Site: 2016–17
 BBC Sport – Club Stats
 Soccerbase – Results | Squad Stats | Transfers

Coventry City
Coventry City F.C. seasons